Trachelipus palustris is a species of woodlouse in the genus Trachelipus that can be found on islands like Crete and Cyclades, and also in mainland Greece.

References

Trachelipodidae
Woodlice of Europe
Crustaceans described in 1929